Walt Disney's Treasury of Classic Tales is a series of hardcover books that collects the Sunday comic strips of Walt Disney's Treasury of Classic Tales, an umbrella title for comic strips which were drawn by several different Disney artists during the period of the early 1950s to the mid-1980s. The Treasury of Classic Tales comic strips were used by Walt Disney Studios to introduce current movie characters into comic adaptations for the public. The books are being published by IDW Publishing's imprint, The Library of American Comics. The first book of the series was released in November 2016.

In April 2018, it was announced that, due to the sales goal of the series not being met, the third volume may be the last one to be published.

Format

The hardcover books have a sewn binding, a sewn linen ribbon bookmark, and a dust jacket. They measure 12 × 8.5 inches or 305 × 216 mm.

They are printed in full colour, as were the original comic strip publications. Each volume of the series has approximately 230 pages, some of which contain supplementary materials. Every book has an introduction written by the animation historian Michael Barrier. Background information on each featured comic story is consistently presented before each comic strip. All are prefaced with an introduction which includes comparisons between the movie and comic strip adaptation, trivia about the movie, and Walt Disney's motivation and biographical touchstones.

Volumes in the series are sold separately. The release schedule for the series is one volume per year.

Volumes

See also
Walt Disney's Treasury of Classic Tales

Other Walt Disney comic strip collections
Walt Disney's Mickey Mouse
Silly Symphonies: The Complete Disney Classics
Donald Duck: The Complete Daily Newspaper Comics
Donald Duck: The Complete Sunday Comics

References

External links 

 Walt Disney's Treasury of Classic Tales at the INDUCKS
 Walt Disney's Treasury of Classic Tales Publisher's website - IDW Publishing - The Library of American Comics
 Inside look of Walt Disney's Treasury of Classic tales Vol. 1 Library of American Comics' YouTube channel

The Library of American Comics publications
Comic strip collection books
Disney comics titles